Scott Owens may refer to:

Scott Owens (poet) (born 1963), American poet
Scott Owens (ice hockey) (born 1956), American ice hockey coach